Pinocchio is a 2012 Italian animated film directed by Enzo D'Alò. It is based on the 1883 novel The Adventures of Pinocchio by Carlo Collodi. The film had a budget of about €8 million. It was screened out of competition at the 70th Venice International Film Festival.

The original score was composed by Lucio Dalla, and includes songs performed by Leda Battisti and Nada. The vocal cast of the film includes Rocco Papaleo, Maurizio Micheli, Paolo Ruffini, Andy Luotto, and Lucio Dalla.

An English dub was made in Canada the same year, and it was released in the United Kingdom by Koch Media on 4 November 2013 (as Pinocchio - The Adventures of Pinocchio) and in Australia and New Zealand by Rialto Distribution. It was released in the United States by Lionsgate Home Entertainment on 10 April 2018, with some characters re-dubbed by celebrities.

Plot

In a small village in Tuscany, the poor carpenter Geppetto decides to forge a wooden puppet naming it Pinocchio. Pinocchio, however, starts running all over the city, sowing weeds between one street and another, until he is stopped by two carabinieri. When Pinocchio refuses to go home, the carabinieri, hearing people think that Geppetto is probably violent with the puppet, arrest him and let go of Pinocchio. Ignoring warnings from a talking cricket, who Pinocchio silences with a hammer, Pinocchio goes home, and dreams of his life as a vagabond who he intends to do. When Geppetto returns, the next morning, Pinocchio, having burned off his feet, agrees to behave well and to start going to school.

To allow him to study, Geppetto sells his tunic for the abbey, but Pinocchio, instead of going to school, sells the book to attend a puppet show. Also living, the puppets invite Pinocchio to the stage, angering Fire-Eater, who first intends to burn him but then changes his mind and gives him gold coins, after learning about Geppetto, and sends him home escorted by his employees, the Fox and the Cat, who trick him into taking the money, telling him about the Fields of Miracles, where coins sprout in trees of money.

After a night at an inn, Pinocchio strolls out, again ignoring the Cricket, only to be pursued by the Cat and the Fox posing as bandits who hang him for his money. A fairy with blue hair shows compassion on him and gets her servants to set him free. After some firm but fair words from the Cricket and encouragement from the Fairy, Pinocchio goes on his way to his father. But the Fox and the Cat mislead him into going with them to the Field of Mircales. After he plants them, he learns from a parrot the Fox and the Cat conned him and stole his money. He tells a gorilla chairman, only to be locked up in a prison cell. Eventually he is released by the dog guard.

Voice cast
 Gabriele Caprio - Pinocchio
 Mino Caprio - Geppetto
 Carlo Valli - Grillo Parlante
 Maricla Affatato - La Volpe
 Maurizio Micheli - Il Gatto
 Rocco Papaleo - Mangiafuoco
 Lucrezia Marricchi - La Fata dai Capelli Turchini
 Paolo Ruffini - Lucignolo

English dub cast
 Robert Naylor - Pinocchio
 Michael Rudder - Geppetto
 Arthur Grosser - Talking Cricket
 Sonja Ball - The Fox, Soprano, Teacher
 Thor Bishopric - The Cat, Curious Man
 Vlasta Vrána - Fire-Eater, The Jailer
 Jennifer Suliteneau - The Fairy with Turquoise Hair
 Noah Bernett - Wickley
 Maria Bircher - Curious Woman, The Dove
 Raphael Cohen - Gervaso, Young Geppetto
 Julian D'Addario - Arturo
 Richard Dumont - Punch
 A.J. Henderson - Alidoro, Seller
 Arthur Holden - Policeman #1, The Owl, Town Crier
 Rick Jones - Harlequin, Parrot, The Judge, The Ringmaster
 Richard Jutras - The Butterman
 Ranee Lee - Singer at Inn
 Michel Perron - Clown #1, The Innkeeper
 Donovan Reiter - Clown #2, Fisherman
 Terrence Scammell - Busker, Citizen, Policeman #2, Principal
 Harry Standjofski - The Crow, The Green Fisherman

2018 American release:
 Johnny Orlando - Pinocchio
 Ambyr Childers - Trixie the Fox 
 Jon Heder - Leo the Cat

Reception
Common Sense Media gave the show 3 out of 5 stars, praising the animation, characters and familiar messages.

References

External links
 

2012 films
2012 animated films
2010s French animated films
Italian animated films
Belgian animated films
Animated films based on children's books
French animated feature films
2010s children's fantasy films
Pinocchio films
Italian fantasy films
Films directed by Enzo D'Alò
Animated films based on novels